Krusze may refer to the following places:
Krusze, Kuyavian-Pomeranian Voivodeship (north-central Poland)
Krusze, Masovian Voivodeship (east-central Poland)
Krusze, Warmian-Masurian Voivodeship (north Poland)
Krusze, West Pomeranian Voivodeship (north-west Poland)